Yann Collette (born 14 April 1956) is a French actor. He appeared in more than sixty films since 1979.

Selected filmography

References

External links 

1956 births
Living people
French male film actors